Mikhail Stanislavovich Shaidorov (born 25 June 2004) is a Kazakhstani figure skater. He is the 2021 Sofia Trophy bronze medalist, a two-time fifth-place finisher at the Four Continents Championships (2022, 2023), and a three-time Kazakhstani national champion (2020, 2021, 2023). Shaidorov finished fourth at the 2023 Winter World University Games.

He is also the 2022 World Junior and 2021 JGP Poland silver medalist.

Programs

Competitive highlights 
GP: Grand Prix; CS: Challenger Series; JGP: Junior Grand Prix

Detailed results 
Small medals for short and free programs awarded only at ISU Championships. Personal bests highlighted in bold.

Senior results

Junior results

References

External links 
 
 

2004 births
Living people
Kazakhstani male single skaters
Sportspeople from Almaty
World Junior Figure Skating Championships medalists
Competitors at the 2023 Winter World University Games